The 2012 FIA WTCC Race of Portugal was the seventh round of the 2012 World Touring Car Championship season and the sixth running of the FIA WTCC Race of Portugal. It was held on 3 June 2012 at the Autódromo Internacional do Algarve in Portimão, Portugal. The first race was won by Yvan Muller for Chevrolet and the second race was won by Alain Menu, also for Chevrolet.

Background
Coming into the event, Yvan Muller was the championship leader on 206 points ahead of Robert Huff on 198 and Menu on 175 points. Pepe Oriola was leading the Yokohama Independents' Trophy.

James Thompson and TMS Sport made their last scheduled appearance of the season with the Lada Granta WTCC. Tom Boardman switched to the new SEAT turbocharged engine, having run the TDi engine since Spain.

For the Race of Portugal weekend, Menu would be playing the role of comic book character Michel Vaillant. His Chevrolet Cruze raced in special Vaillante colours and Menu himself wore a special race suit and dyed his hair to look like the French comic book racer.

Report

Free Practice
Lukoil Racing Team's Gabriele Tarquini set the pace in the first free practice session, nearly half a second ahead of the Chevrolet of Yvan Muller. Thompson put the TMS Sport Lada in 10th.

It was a Chevrolet 1-2-3 in the second practice session, with Yvan Muller topping the timing pages ahead of Menu and Huff.

Qualifying
Tarquini took his second pole position of the season with Yvan Muller second for Chevrolet and Norbert Michelisz third for Zengő Motorsport. The race two reversed grid would see Tuenti Racing Team's Pepe Oriola starting on position with Menu starting second. The session was stopped early on when Tom Chilton suffered a suspension failure, he and his team mate James Nash would form an all Ford back row.

Warm-Up
Muller went fastest in Sunday morning's warm-up session ahead of Chevrolet team mates of Huff and Menu.

Race One
Muller overtook Tarquini on the outside into turn one to take the lead, while further down the field, Aleksei Dudukalo and Gábor Wéber made contact and ended up in the gravel. Both drivers were able to get back on track and return to the pits. Muller held on to take the win ahead of Tarquini and Huff, with Michelisz the winning independent after coming home in fourth. Menu had climbed up to fifth position while the only remaining non-SEAT engined León of Tiago Monteiro spent much of the race defending his seventh place.

Race Two
A near repeat of race one saw the Chevrolet of Menu overtake pole sitter Oriola before the first corner. Further back, Mehdi Bennani made contact with Stefano D'Aste which earned him a suspended grid penalty. Tarquini had been defending from the Chevrolets of Muller and Huff when he took too much kerb, allowing Muller through. Huff and Tarquini made contact, spinning the Italian out of the race while Muller spun at his own accord. ROAL Motorsport's Alberto Cerqui took advantage of Muller's off to take fifth, a position that was later switched on the main straight. Menu took the victory ahead of podium debutant Oriola with Tom Coronel third.

Results

Qualifying

Bold denotes Pole position for second race.

Race 1

Bold denotes Fastest lap.

Race 2

Bold denotes Fastest lap.

Standings after the round

Drivers' Championship standings

Yokohama Independents' Trophy standings

Manufacturers' Championship standings

 Note: Only the top five positions are included for both sets of drivers' standings.

References

External links 

Portugal
Race of Portugal